The Strait of Baltiysk is a strait enabling passage from the Baltic Sea into the brackish Vistula Lagoon, located in Kaliningrad Oblast, Russia.  The constructed strait separates the Sambian Peninsula and the Vistula Spit, and is at the northeastern side of the lagoon.

Shipping
The strait is the shipping connection from the high sea to the important Russian ports of Baltiysk and Kaliningrad in the northeastern lagoon, as well as to the Polish ports of  Elbląg, Braniewo, Tolkmicko, Frombork, Sztutowo, Krynica Morska, and Nowa Pasłęka in the southeastern lagoon. 
On  17 September 2022, Poland opened a new canal through the Vistula Spit, which will allow ships to enter the Polish port of Elbląg without passing through the Strait of Baltiysk in Russia's Kaliningrad region.

Russian blockade
The Strait of Baltiysk is a strait where international navigation is governed by a non-suspendable innocent passage regime under the United Nations Convention on the Law of the Sea (dead-end strait). Despite the law since the 1990s Russia periodically blocks navigation via the strait to Polish ports. 
Since 2006, Poland has considered digging another canal across the Vistula Spit in order to circumvent this restriction. The Vistula Spit canal was eventually built in 2019-2022.

History
In 1497 a storm surge dug a new gat, then called the Neues [Pillauer] Tief or Pillauer Seetief (New [Pillau] Deep, Pillau Sea Deep), through the Vistula Spit. In 1510 another storm surge widened and deepened that gat to navigability. The Swedes extended the adjacent Pillau village and built its first place of worship, a Lutheran church. In 1638 the Duke moved his residence to the close-by ducal capital Königsberg in Prussia.

Kursenieki

While today the Kursenieki, also known as Kuršininkai, are a nearly extinct Baltic ethnic group living along the Curonian Spit, in 1649 Kuršininkai settlement spanned from Memel (Klaipėda) to Danzig (Gdańsk). The Kuršininkai were eventually assimilated by the Germans, except along the Curonian Spit where some still live. The Kuršininkai were considered Latvians until after World War I when Latvia gained independence from the Russian Empire, a consideration based on linguistic arguments. This was the rationale for Latvian claims over the Curonian Spit, Memel, and other territories of East Prussia which would be later dropped.

References

Baltiysk
Baltiysk
Bodies of water of Kaliningrad Oblast